"My Last Affair" (sometimes This Is My Last Affair) is a song written by Haven Johnson and introduced by Billie Haywood in the Broadway musical revue New Faces of 1936. Popular recordings in 1937 were by Mildred Bailey; Teddy Wilson and His Orchestra (vocal by Billie Holiday); and by Jimmie Lunceford and His Orchestra.

Other notable recordings
Ella Fitzgerald - a single release for Decca Records (catalog 1061) in 1936 and for the album Ella and Basie! (1963)
Lionel Hampton and His Orchestra, recorded for Victor Records (catalog No. 25527A) on February 8, 1937.
Peggy Lee - a transcription session in 1945.
The Serenaders c.1950.

This poetic tune also had been recorded on '78 Radio Transcription Disk, presented by Violet Wanita Hamilton on NBC Radio, within a Three X Sisters song set in 1937.

References

1936 songs
Billie Holiday songs
Peggy Lee songs
Ella Fitzgerald songs